Nørresundby is a city in Aalborg Municipality, north of Limfjorden, in Vendsyssel, in Denmark. The urban area has a population of 23,718 (1 January 2021). It is located just north of Aalborg, which lies south of Limfjorden. Statistically its own urban area since 2006, it is often still considered part of Aalborg, sometimes the name Greater Aalborg (Stor-Aalborg) is used to describe the concept.

The city is connected to Aalborg by Limfjordsbroen, which is a road bridge, and an iron railway bridge, as well as a motorway (E45) passing it to the east and running under the Limfjord.

Nørresundby is the site of the Lindholm Høje settlement and burial ground from the Germanic Iron Age and Viking times. There is also a museum on the site.

Nørresundby has many sports clubs, most notably Lindholm IF, whose highest ranking football team as of the 2013–14 season play at the fourth-highest Danish level, Danmarksserien.

History 

In 1865 a pontoon bridge by the name of Christian IX's pontoon bridge was built. Fourteen years later in 1879 a railroad bridge was built, which, although it was replaced in 1938, still stands today. In 1933, the pontoon bridge was removed and a new bridge, called the Limfjords bridge (Limfjordsbroen), was built in its place. Five years later, on 29 May 1938, Aalborg Airport opened. 

Through 1958–1960 the Limfjords bridge was expanded and in 1969 the Limfjords tunnel (Limfjordstunnelen) east of Nørresundby was opened. As a supplement to these bridges and the railway bridge, there have, for several years, been spoken about adding a fourth connection over the Limfjord, although no direct action have been taken.

Transportation

Airport 
Aalborg Airport is located west of Nørresundby. North Flying has its head office in the North Flying Terminal at Aalborg Airport in Nørresundby.

Rail 
Nørresundby is served by Lindholm railway station, located in the district of Lindholm in the western part of the city. Lindholm station is located on the Vendsyssel Line between Aalborg and Frederikshavn. It offers direct InterCity services to Copenhagen, regional train services to Aalborg and Frederikshavn, and is the northern terminus of the Aalborg Commuter Rail service to Skørping.

Road 
The city is connected to Aalborg by a road bridge Limfjordsbroen, as well as a motorway (E45) passing it to the east and running under the Limfjord.

Notable people 

 Just Høg (1584 at Vang, Nørresundby - 1646) a Danish statesman and landowner
 Søren Jessen-Petersen (born 1945 in Nørresundby) a Danish lawyer and UN civil servant
 Frank Aaen (born 1951 in Nørresundby) a Danish economist and politician
 Orla Hav (born 1952 in Nørresundby) politician, Mayor of North Jutland County and member of the Danish Parliament
 Preben Bang Henriksen (born 1954 in Nørresundby) a Danish barrister and politician
 Tine Lindhardt (born 1957 in Nørresundby) theologist, Lutheran bishop of Diocese of Funen
 Ole Bornedal (born 1959 in Nørresundby) a Danish film director, actor and producer 
 Mohamed Ali (born 1993 in Nørresundby) a Danish singer of mixed Egyptian and Iraqi origin

Sport 
 Henry Nielsen (1910 in Nørresundby – 1969) a Danish middle- and long-distance runner, 3000 m world record holder 1934-1936 
 Verner Nielsen (born 1931 in Nørresundby) a former footballer, played 26 games for Denmark
 Henning Jensen (1949–2017) a Danish football player, 125 club caps with Borussia Mönchengladbach and scored 9 goals in 21 games for Denmark

Nørresundby Gymnasium & HF 
Nørresundby Gymnasium & HF is an upper secondary school in the city of Nørresundby, in North Jutland in Denmark. The school offers the traditional three-year program but also the so-called Higher Preparatory Examination (HF), which takes two years to complete. Nørresundby Gymnasium & HF is a certified Cambridge & Science school and it is furthermore open for exchange students. The school offers 12 different streams of studies. It is one of the only ones offering Greek as a subject.

References

 
Neighbourhoods in Aalborg